The Las Vegas Walk of Stars, located in Las Vegas, Nevada, started in October 2004  to honor the people who helped make Vegas famous.  The stars are located along a 4-mile stretch on both sides of Las Vegas Blvd between Sahara Ave and Russell Rd.  Wayne Newton was first to be honored on October 26, 2004, followed in 2005 by Frank Marino, Liberace, Rich Little, Line Renaud and Dick Jensen. In 2010, Frank Marino became the first entertainer to have earned induction into the Walk of Stars twice. In 2010, Cuban music icons Gloria Estefan and Emilio Estefan were the first couple recognized, who shared a star. In 2011, Mexican power couple Jenni Rivera and Esteban Loaiza were the second couple to be recognized by the Las Vegas Strip attraction. On February 17, 2008 singer, entertainer, television host and producer, Tony Sacca became the 23rd star recipient.

In March 2018, it was reported 39 of the 82 stars in the Las Vegas Walk of Stars were removed and presumably destroyed during installation of security bollards along the Las Vegas Strip. Officials claimed the stars could not survive a relocation. Among the stars removed were those honoring Wayne Newton, Liberace, Rich Little, John Stuart, Sammy Davis Jr. and Elvis Presley.

After being removed from in front of the old Riveria Hotel, Presley's star is now located in front of the Paris Las Vegas Hotel and Casino. The ceremony was sponsored by the Viva Las Vegas Club with donations coming from fans worldwide.

Honorees

References

External links

 

Walks of fame
Tourist attractions in the Las Vegas Valley
2005 establishments in Nevada
Las Vegas Strip